Curt Apduhan is a director of photography known for his work in feature documentaries. Apduhan's contributions to director Todd Robinson's documentary film Amargosa, a study of  artist Marta Becket earned the cinematographer the NATAS 2002 News/Documentary Emmy for outstanding achievement in cinematography

Most Valuable Players, a feature documentary about a high school musical theatre competition named the Freddy Awards in the Lehigh Valley of Pennsylvania is Apduhan's latest film for director Matthew Kallis and producer Christopher Lockhart

Apduhan also contributed filmed segments to the David Crosby television documentary Stand And Be Counted which aired on TLC.

Apduhan was the cinematographer for Go Tigers! a feature documentary about the Ohio high school football program of the Massillon Washington High School Tigers

Films
Reboot directed by Joe Kawasaki
Most Valuable Players directed by Matthew Kallis
Go Tigers! directed by Kenneth Carlson
Amargosa directed by Todd Robinson

References

External links
Curt Apduhan official site.

American cinematographers
Living people
Year of birth missing (living people)